The Hofstra Pride baseball team is the varsity intercollegiate baseball team of Hofstra University in Hempstead, New York, United States. The team competes in the National Collegiate Athletic Association's Division I and are members of the Colonial Athletic Association.

The Pride play home games at University Field in Hempstead.

The team's head coach is former MLB infielder / outfielder Frank Catalanotto.

References

External links